Philip 'Pip' Blackwell (born 27 November 1974) is an English former professional darts player who plays in British Darts Organisation tournaments.

Career

Pip Blackwell started to play darts when he was 11. He joined the BDO Circuit in 2007 but had to wait for his first successes till 2014 when he four times reached the finals of BDO events the Muensterland Classic losing to Scott Mitchell, BDO Gold Cup losing to Wayne Warren, British Classic and the Swedish Open losing both to Alan Norris.
He took part in the Winmau World Masters 2014 where he lost in the last eight to Jamie Hughes by 1-3. By the ranking Blackwell qualified for the BDO World Darts Championship which had always been a lifetime ambition but was eliminated first round 1-3 by a strong Ross Montgomery.

2017
As of 11 June he has not participated in any darts event.

2020
Blackwell rejoining the BDO in February.

World Championship results

BDO

 2015: First Round (lost to Ross Montgomery 1-3)
 2016: First Round (lost to Martin Atkins 0-3)
2017: Second Round (lost to Darryl Fitton 1-4)

External links
Pip Blackwell's profile and stats on Darts Database

References

1974 births
Living people
English darts players
British Darts Organisation players